Bohani  is a village located in the Gadarwara taluk in Narsinghpur district of the Jabalpur division in the Indian state of Madhya Pradesh.

Economy 
The economy of Bohani is dependent on agriculture;  mainly sugarcane. Other notable products include vegetables, fruits, oil-seed, flowers, and dairy products.

Philanthropy 
Danveer Choudhary Raghav Singh ji donated 256 acres of land to the State Government of Madhya Pradesh for Schools and for the betterment of the people. It is said that the Chief Minister of that time had come to receive the donation. The Government school is also named after him which is called Govt Raghav Krishi Higher Secondary School.

Education 
Bohani has seven schools:
 Government Primary School (GPS) – Bohani GPS is the only primary school serving grades 1 through 5. It is managed by the Department of Education of Madhya Pradesh.
 Government Middle School (GMS) – Bohani GMS school is a co-educational school recognised by Madhya Pradesh, serving grades 6 through 8.
 Government High School (GHS) – Raghav Krishi Govt. High School.
 Swami Vivekananda Public School.
Jawahar Navodaya Vidyalaya Bohani, Narsinghpur(M.P.), which the central government manages.
Trinity Memorial International School.

Health Services 
There are three main health services in Bohani:
 Government hospital
 Government Animal Health Center
 Private Clinic

Water 
Bohani is connected to many water-pipelines. However, wells (including tube wells) are used often for agricultural irrigation purposes.

Communication and Internet 
 Bharat Sanchar Nigam Limited provides landline and broadband services.
 2G and 4G mobile services are available.
FTTH internet by Gram Panchayat National Broadband Network - BBNL
Fibre based internet by Bharat Sanchar Nigam Limited

Demographics 
Bohani has 839 families, and a total population of 3,601.

Transport

Notable Families

Madaria Family 
Madaria family is one of the respected family in Bohani village.

Dheeraj Singh Madaria in late 1800 was one of the respected person in Gadarwara area, his grandsons: Ghanshyam Prasad (Retired as Police Auditor), Pannalal Madaria (settled in Bohani after retirement), Gopal Prasad, Jagannath and great grandchildren (some of them as mentioned below).

Manmohan Madaria , B.Sc., M.A., LL.B., Dip in Jour. who was one of the prominent writer & recipient of state level literary award, born here in Bohani, worked as Asst Editor Navabhart, later worked in Govt of Madhya Pradesh, retired as an Editor of Panchayat & Samaj Seva (Class 1 officer). His article/ story has been included in the Hindi text book of Madhya Pradesh State Board curriculum.

Rajendra Kumar Madaria , M.Sc. also born in Bohani and retired as Scientist G from DRDO's Solid State Physics Laboratory New Delhi. He worked on many defence projects and contributed in the development of country. His research papers were published in many national and international journals.

Virendra Kumar Madaria , M.Sc.(Ag) also born in Bohani and retired as Deputy Director from Agriculture deptt of Govt of Madhya Pradesh, living in Bohani and providing consultancy to the local farmers.

Mahesh Prasad Madaria, M.Sw. retired as Deputy Director from Panchayat & Social Welfare deptt of Govt of Madhya Pradesh.

Late. Dr. Suresh Kumar Madaria , M.Sc.(Ag), Ph.D. was also born in Bohani, did his research on LAL CHANA and retired from Govt of Madhya Pradesh, He used to live in Bohani and used to provide consultancy to the local farmers.

References

Villages in Narsinghpur district